St Matthew's Church, Leyburn my refer to:
 St Matthew's Church, Leyburn, North Yorkshire, England
 St Matthew's Church, Leyburn, Queensland, Australia